Lost Souls is the tenth studio album by Canadian singer Loreena McKennitt, which was released on May 11, 2018. The track "The Ballad of the Fox Hunter" is an adaptation of the poem by W. B. Yeats, and "La Belle Dame Sans Merci" is an adaptation of the poem by John Keats.

Track listing

Personnel
Ana Alcaide - Nyckelharpa
Tal Bergman - Drums, Percussion
Robert Brian - Drums, Percussion
Stuart Bruce - Engineer, Mixing Engineer
Daniel Casares - Flamenco Guitar, Handclapping
Panos Dimitrakopoulos - Kanonaki
Nigel Eaton - Hurdy-gurdy
Graham Hargrove - Antique Cymbal, Drums (Bass), Drums (Snare)
Ian Harper - Highland Bagpipe
Brian Hughes - Bouzouki, Guitar, Guitar (Electric), Synthesizer
Caroline Lavelle - Cello, Concertina
Rick Lazar - Percussion
Bob Ludwig - Mastering Engineer
Hugh Marsh - Violin
Loreena McKennitt - Accordion, Harp, Keyboards, Piano, Vocals
Dudley Phillips - Acoustic Bass, Electric Bass
Hossam Ramzy - Percussion
Miguel Ortiz Ruvira - Handclapping, Percussion
Yossi Shakked - Engineer
Sokratis Sinopoulos - Lyra
Michael White - Trumpet
Jeff Wolpert - Engineer, Mixing Engineer
Haig Yazdjian - Oud

Charts

References

2018 albums
Loreena McKennitt albums